Gambir may refer to:

 Uncaria gambir, a tropical shrub
 Gambier, an astringent extract made from Uncaria gambir
 Gambir, a Mongolian layered fried bread also known as kattama

Places
 Gambir, Jakarta, Indonesia
 Gambir, Gambir, administrative village within the Gambir subdistrict
 Gambir railway station, major railway station in Gambir, Jakarta
 Gambir Market, market held in 1906 and yearly from 1921 until 1942 in Jakarta
 Bukit Gambir, Malaysia

See also
 Gambier, preferred English spelling of the Malay word gambir
 Gambira